
Gmina Witonia is a rural gmina (administrative district) in Łęczyca County, Łódź Voivodeship, in central Poland.

Villages
Gmina Witonia contains the villages and settlements of Anusin, Budki Stare, Gajew, Gledzianów, Gledzianówek, Gołocice, Gozdków, Józefów, Józinki, Kostusin, Kuchary, Michały, Nędzerzew, Olesice, Oraczew, Romartów, Rudniki, Rybitwy, Stara Wargawa, Szamów, Uwielinek, Wargawka, Wargawka Młoda, Węglewice, Węglewice-Kolonia and Witonia.

Neighbouring gminas
Gmina Witonia is bordered by the gminas of Daszyna, Góra Świętej Małgorzaty, Krzyżanów, Kutno and Łęczyca.

References
Polish official population figures 2006

Witonia
Łęczyca County